The 1978 Speedway World Pairs Championship was the ninth FIM Speedway World Pairs Championship. The final took place in Chorzów, Poland. The championship was won by England who beat New Zealand after Run-Off (both 24 points). Bronze medal was won by Denmark (21 points).

Semifinal 1
  Skien
 June 11

Semifinal 2
  Debrecen
 June 11

World final
  Chorzów, Silesian Stadium
 June 25

See also
 1978 Individual Speedway World Championship
 1978 Speedway World Team Cup
 motorcycle speedway
 1978 in sports

References

1978
World Pairs